The Fiat A.24 was an Italian water-cooled aircraft engine from the 1920s.

Design and development
During the second half of the 1920s Fiat introduced several water-cooled aircraft engines, including the A.20, A.22, A24, A.25 and A.30.  They were all upright V-12s with 60° between the cylinder banks; capacities ranged between 18.7 L and 54.5 L (1,141-3,326 cu in) and power outputs between 320 kW and 745 kW (430-1,000 hp). Producing 520 kW (700 hp) from 32.3 L (1,971 cu in), the A.24 was near the center of this range.  

When Fiat was advised by the Italian government to simplify their water-cooled product line, they decided to focus on the A.20, A.22 and A.30 models such that the A.24 was not manufactured in large numbers.

Variants
A.24 Initial version, ungeared.
A.24 R. Geared output.

Applications

From Thompson.

CMASA MF.5
Fiat BRG
Savoia-Marchetti S.55A
Savoia-Marchetti S.66

Specifications (A.24R)

See also

References

1920s aircraft piston engines
A.24